Dithionous acid is a sulfur oxoacid with the chemical formula H2S2O4.  It is unstable in pure form, but its salts, known as dithionites, are stable.

It was initially assumed that the C2 symmetric structure HOS(=O)-S(=O)OH  is the most stable among molecules with the formula  using ab initio calculations. The reason for this is the existence of intermolecular hydrogen bonds. It is now known that dithionous acid spontaneously decomposes to SO2 and S(OH)2.

Sodium dithionite is a white powder used as a reductant and a bleaching agent. It is also used to reduce the nitro group to an amino group in organic reactions.

References

Sulfur oxoacids
Dithionites